Sir Charles William Stanley Rees (30 November 1907 – 13 December 2000) was a high court judge in England.

Early life
Rees  was born on 30 November 1907. He went to St. Andrew's College, Grahamstown, after which he went to University College, Oxford, where he read Law. He practised law in London from 1931.

Military and legal career

At the outbreak of the Second World War, Rees became an officer in the Royal Artillery, 99th Anti-Aircraft Regiment.

In 1957, Rees became a barrister and in 1962 was appointed a judge in the Family Division of the High Court  and was knighted in the same year.

References

Sources

External links

1907 births
2000 deaths
South African emigrants to the United Kingdom
Alumni of St. Andrew's College, Grahamstown
British Army personnel of World War II
Family Division judges
Knights Bachelor
Royal Artillery officers
People from Port Elizabeth